Cunliffe as an English surname derives from a former place near Rishton, Lancashire.

Notable people with the surname include:
Baron Cunliffe, of Headley in the County of Surrey
Barry Cunliffe (born 1939), Professor of European Archaeology at the University of Oxford
Bill Cunliffe, jazz pianist and composer
Billy Cunliffe, British rugby league footballer
Charles Cunliffe (1858–1884), English cricketer
Cunliffe, Brooks, bank founded in Blackburn, Lancashire, England in 1792
Cunliffe baronets, of Liverpool in the County of Lancaster
Cunliffe-Owen baronets, of Bray in the County of Berkshire
Dan Cunliffe (1875–1937), English footballer
David Cunliffe (born 1963), former New Zealand Labour Party Leader and Leader of the Opposition
David Cunliffe-Lister, 2nd Earl of Swinton, JP, DL (1937–2006), British peer and politician
Sir Foster Cunliffe, 3rd Baronet (1755–1834), founder of the Royal Society of British Bowmen
Foster Cunliffe, English cricketer
Hugo Cunliffe-Owen (1870–1947), English industrialist
Jack Cunliffe, rugby league footballer of the 1930s-1960s for Great Britain, England, British Empire XIII, and Wigan
 Jason Cunliffe (Hollyoaks), a character from the British soap opera Hollyoaks
 Jason Cunliffe (footballer) (born 1983), Guamanian footballer
Jimmy Cunliffe (born 1912), English footballer who played as an inside forward
John Cunliffe (author) (1933–2018), British children's book author who created Postman Pat and Rosie and Jim
John Cunliffe (footballer born 1930) (1930–1975), English footballer
John Cunliffe (footballer born 1984), English football player
Lawrence Cunliffe (born 1929), British Labour Party politician
Marcus Cunliffe (1922–1990), British historian and academic
Mitzi Cunliffe (1918–2006), American sculptor
Nicholas Cunliffe-Lister, 3rd Earl of Swinton (born 1939), British peer
Philip Cunliffe-Lister, 1st Earl of Swinton, GBE, CH, MC, PC (1884–1972), British Conservative politician
R. Cunliffe Gosling DL (1868–1922), Victorian-era footballer
Robert Cunliffe (disambiguation), several people
Roger Cunliffe, 3rd Baron Cunliffe (born 1932), retired management consultant and former project manager
Samuel Cunliffe Lister, 2nd Baron Masham (1857–1917), English baron and industrialist
Sir William Cunliffe Brooks, 1st Baronet (1819–1900), son of Samuel Brooks
Stella Cunliffe MBE (born 1917), Director of Statistics at the British Home Office
Susan Cunliffe-Lister, Countess of Swinton (born 1935), crossbench member of the House of Lords
Tom Cunliffe, British yachting journalist, author and broadcaster
Walter Cunliffe, 1st Baron Cunliffe, GBE (1855–1920), Governor of the Bank of England from 1913 to 1918
Whit Cunliffe (1876–1966), English comic singer

See also 

 Cunliffe-Owen Aircraft, British aircraft manufacturer of the World War II era

References 

English toponymic surnames